Aphnaeus gilloni, the red silver spot, is a butterfly in the family Lycaenidae. It is found in Ivory Coast, Ghana (the Volta Region), Cameroon and possibly Uganda.

References

Butterflies described in 1966
Aphnaeus